The All-Ireland Senior Hurling Championship of 1982 was the 96th staging of Ireland's premier hurling knock-out competition. Kilkenny won the championship, beating Cork 3–18 to 1–13 in the final at Croke Park, Dublin.

The championship

Participating counties

Format

Leinster championship

Quarter-finals: (2 matches) These are two lone matches between the first four teams drawn from the province of Leinster.  Two teams are eliminated at this stage, while two teams advance to the semi-finals.

Semi-finals: (2 matches) The winners of the two quarter-finals join two other Leinster teams to make up the semi-final pairings.  Two teams are eliminated at this stage, while two teams advance to the final.

Final: (1 match) The winners of the two semi-finals contest this game.  One team is eliminated at this stage, while the winners advance to the All-Ireland semi-final.

Munster championship

Quarter-final: (1 match) This is a lone match between the first two teams drawn from the province of Munster.  One team is eliminated at this stage, while the winners advance to the semi-finals.

Semi-finals: (2 matches) The winners of the lone quarter-final join the other three Munster teams to make up the semi-final pairings.  Two teams are eliminated at this stage, while two teams advance to the final.

Final: (1 match) The winners of the two semi-finals contest this game.  One team is eliminated at this stage, while the winners advance directly to the All-Ireland final.

All-Ireland Championship
Quarter-final: (1 match) This is a lone match between Galway and the All-Ireland 'B' champions.  One team is eliminated at this stage, while the winners advance to the All-Ireland semi-final where they play the Leinster champions.

Semi-final: (1 match) This is a lone match between the winners of the All-Ireland quarter-final and the Leinster champions.  One team is eliminated at this stage, while the winners advance to the All-Ireland final.

Final: (1 match) The winners of the lone semi-final winners will play the Munster champions in the All-Ireland final.

Fixtures

Leinster Senior Hurling Championship

Munster Senior Hurling Championship

All-Ireland Senior Hurling Championship

Championship statistics

Scoring

Widest winning margin: 39 points
Kilkenny 7–31 : 0–13 Westmeath (Leinster semi-final)
Most goals in a match: 9
Galway 6–19 : 3–12 Antrim (All-Ireland semi-final)
Most points in a match: 44
Kilkenny 7–31 : 0–13 Westmeath (Leinster semi-final)
Most goals by one team in a match: 7
Kilkenny 7–31 : 0–13 Westmeath (Leinster semi-final)
Most goals scored by a losing team: 3
Wexford 3–12 : 2–16 Offaly (Leinster quarter-final)
Waterford 3–6 : 5–31 Cork (Munster final)
Antrim 3–12 : 6–19 Galway (All-Ireland semi-final)
Most points scored by a losing team: 14
Laois 0–14 : 2–17 Offaly (Leinster semi-final replay)

Overall
Most goals scored – Kilkenny (13)
Most goals conceded – Cork (10)

Miscellaneous
 In the Leinster semi-final Kilkenny scored 7-31 against Westmeath, it was the first time more than thirty points were scored over the bar in a seventy minutes championship match.
 Cork's 31-point defeat of Waterford in the Munster final is a record which still stands.

Top scorers

Season

Single game

Broadcasting

The following matches were broadcast live on television in Ireland on RTÉ.

References
 Corry, Eoghan, The GAA Book of Lists (Hodder Headline Ireland, 2005).
 Donegan, Des, The Complete Handbook of Gaelic Games (DBA Publications Limited, 2005).

External links
All-Ireland Senior Hurling Championship 1982 Results

See also

1982